The Autonomous University of Baja California, Tijuana is one of three main campuses of the Autonomous University of Baja California (UABC), located in the Otay Centenario borough of Tijuana, Baja California state, México. It is a public research university.

Sub-campuses
The Tijuana branch of the Autonomous University of Baja California maintains three sub-campuses in the Municipality of Tijuana, in the towns of: 
Tecate, 
Rosarito Beach
Valle de las Palmas

Departments

Chemistry Sciences and Engineering
Faculty of Chemistry Sciences and Engineering:
 Industrial Chemistry
 Chemistry Engineering
 Engineering on  Pharmacobiology 
 Engineering on Computer sciences
 Engineering on Electronics
 Industrial Engineering

Arts
Faculty of Arts:
 Bachelor's degree on Plastic Arts
 Bachelor's degree on Theater

Humanities and Social Sciences
Faculty of Humanities and Social Sciences:
 Bachelor's degree in Hispanic Literature
 Bachelor's degree in History
 Bachelor's degree in Sociology
 Bachelor's degree in Philosophy
 Bachelor's degree in Communication
 Bachelor's degree in Teacher on Literature
 Bachelor's degree in Teacher on Mathematics

Tourism and Marketing
 Bachelor's degree in Tourism
 Bachelor's degree  in Tourism Management
 Bachelor's degree in Marketing

Architecture and Design
 Bachelor's degree in Architecture
 Bachelor's degree in Graphic Design
 Bachelor's degree in Industrial Design

Law
 Bachelor's degree in Law

Modern Languages
 Bachelor's degree in Language Education
 Bachelor's degree in Translation

Medicine and Psychology
 Bachelor's degree in Medicine
 Bachelor's degree in Psychology
 Bachelor's degree in Nutrition

Dentistry
 Bachelor's degree in Dental Surgery

Accounting and Business Administration
 Bachelor's degree in Accounting
 Bachelor's degree in Business Administration
 Bachelor's degree in Information Systems
 Bachelor's degree in International Business

References

External links

T
Education in Tijuana